Japan competed at the 2014 Winter Olympics in Sochi, Russia from 7 to 23 February 2014. Japan's team consisted of 136 athletes in all 15 sports.

The 2014 Games marked the first time a Japanese Olympic team competed in Russia, as Japan and 64 western countries did not take part at the American-led boycott in the 1980 Summer Olympics held in Moscow due to the Soviet–Afghan War.

Japan's Prime Minister Shinzo Abe attended the opening ceremony, wanting to show the Russians how important the relationship between the two countries is.

Medalists

Alpine skiing 

According to the quota allocation released on January 27, 2014, Japan has achieved two quota spots in alpine skiing. No one of the several female skiers regularly competing in the World Cup managed to achieve qualification.

Biathlon 

Based on their performance at the 2012 and 2013 Biathlon World Championships Japan qualified 1 man and 4 women.

Bobsleigh

* – Denotes the driver of each sled

Cross-country skiing 

According to the quota allocation released on January 27, 2014, Japan has qualified a total of 6 athletes (5 men and 1 woman) in cross-country skiing.

Distance
Men

Women

Sprint

Curling

Women's tournament

 Ayumi Ogasawara
 Yumie Funayama
 Kaho Onodera
 Michiko Tomabechi
 Chinami Yoshida

Round-robin
Japan has a bye in draws 1, 5 and 9.

Draw 2
Monday, February 11, 9:00

Draw 3
Tuesday, February 11, 19:00

Draw 4
Wednesday, February 12, 14:00

Draw 6
Thursday, February 13, 19:00

Draw 7
Friday, February 14, 14:00

Draw 8
Saturday, February 15, 9:00

Draw 10
Sunday, February 16, 14:00

Draw 11
Monday, February 17, 9:00

Draw 12
Monday, February 17, 19:00

Figure skating 

Japan's ten member team was announced on December 23, 2013.
Japan has achieved the following quota places:

Team trophy

Freestyle skiing 

Halfpipe

Moguls

Slopestyle

Ice hockey 

Japan qualified a women's team by winning a qualification tournament.
 Women's Tournament - 1 team of 21 athletes

Women's tournament

Roster

Group stage

Luge 

Based on the performance at the 2013–14 Luge World Cup, Japan has achieved only a single quota.

Nordic combined

Short track speed skating 

Based on their performance at World Cup 3 & 4 in November 2013 Japan qualified 5 women and 3 men.

Men

Women

Qualification legend: ADV – Advanced due to being impeded by another skater; FA – Qualify to medal round; FB – Qualify to consolation round

Skeleton

Ski jumping 

Japan has received the following start quotas:

Men

Women

Snowboarding 

Alpine

Freestyle

Qualification Legend: QF – Qualify directly to final; QS – Qualify to semifinal

Snowboard cross

Qualification legend: FA – Qualify to medal round; FB – Qualify to consolation round

Speed skating 

Based on the results from the fall World Cups during the 2013–14 ISU Speed Skating World Cup season, Japan has earned the following start quotas:

Men

Women

Team pursuit

See also
 Japan at the 2014 Summer Youth Olympics
 Japan at the 2014 Winter Paralympics

References

External links

 Japan at the 2014 Winter Olympics 

Nations at the 2014 Winter Olympics
2014
Winter Olympics